KF Osumi is an Albanian football club based in the small municipal unit of Dimal. They are currently competing in the Kategoria e Tretë.

References

Osumi
Osumi
Albanian Third Division clubs